Therion is a genus of ichneumon wasps in the family Ichneumonidae. There are at least 20 described species in Therion.

Species

 Therion brevicorne (Gravenhorst, 1829) c g
 Therion californicum (Cresson, 1879) c g
 Therion circumflexum (Linnaeus, 1758) c g
 Therion ericae (Bauer, 1967) c g
 Therion fuscipenne (Norton, 1863) c g
 Therion giganteum (Gravenhorst, 1829) c g
 Therion inusitatum (Brues, 1910) c g
 Therion magnum (Dasch, 1984) c g
 Therion minutum (Dasch, 1984) c g
 Therion morio (Fabricius, 1781) c g b
 Therion mussouriense (Cameron, 1897) c g
 Therion nigripes (Dreisbach, 1947) c g
 Therion nigrovarium (Brulle, 1846) c g
 Therion petiolatum (Davis, 1898) c b
 Therion ranti (Porter, 1999) c g
 Therion rufomaculatum (Uchida, 1928) c g
 Therion sassacus (Viereck, 1917) c g
 Therion tarsatum (Shestakov, 1923) c g
 Therion tenuipes (Norton, 1863) c g
 Therion texanum (Ashmead, 1890) c
 Therion unguiculum (Gauld, 1978) c g
 Therion wileyi (Porter, 1999) c g
 Therion brachypodicum Zhang, Sun & Zhang, 1994 c g

Data sources: i = ITIS, c = Catalogue of Life, g = GBIF, b = Bugguide.net

References

Further reading

External links

 

Parasitic wasps